Crypsitricha mesotypa is a species of moth in the family Tineidae. It was described by Edward Meyrick in 1888. This species is endemic to New Zealand.

The wingspan is 10–14 mm. The forewings are light brownish-ochreous, irregularly suffused with ochreous-whitish. There are two small black spots on the costa towards the base and a blackish longitudinal mark in the disc near the base, as well as a straight rather oblique thick blackish bar from the costa at two-fifths, reaching more than half across the wing, followed by an ochreous-whitish bar. The space between these blackish markings is suffused with fuscous. The posterior half of the costa is blackish-fuscous spotted with ochreous-whitish and there is a small black spot in disc at two-thirds, more or less distinctly bisected by a projection from an ochreous-whitish spot beneath it. The hindwings are whitish-grey.

References

Moths described in 1888
Tineidae
Moths of New Zealand
Endemic fauna of New Zealand
Taxa named by Edward Meyrick
Endemic moths of New Zealand